Nim Chah (also Romanized as Nīm Chāh) is a village in Qareh Toghan Rural District, in the Central District of Neka County, Mazandaran Province, Iran. At the 2006 census, its population was 424, in 118 families.

References 

Populated places in Neka County